Roman Lucero Kintanar Ph.D. (June 13, 1929 – May 6, 2007) was a scientist in the field of meteorology.

Biography
Kintanar was born in Cebu City, Philippines. Kintanar received his Bachelor of Science in Physics at the University of the Philippines in 1951 before earning a Ph.D. at the University of Texas. He was a member of the Upsilon Sigma Phi fraternity.

Career
Kintanar started out as a weather observer in 1948. On August 1, 1958, he was appointed as the Director of the Weather Bureau, later named the Philippine Atmospheric, Geophysical and Astronomical Services Administration (PAGASA), at the age of 29, the youngest person to hold such a position in Filipino Government service, and stayed in that position for almost 40 years. During his tenure as the head of PAGASA, Kintanar was appointed Third Vice-President of WMO in 1978 before becoming the President of the eighth World Meteorological Organization (WMO) congress in 1979, and was re-elected for another four-year term as the President of the WMO on 1983.

Death and afterward
Kintanar died of cancer on May 6, 2007, at his residence in Quezon City. An asteroid (6636 Kintanar) was named after him in 2007 for his contributions to the science of meteorology.

Awards
1978: Parangal ng PAGASA award
1980: Lingkod Bayan Award, Career Executive Service Board
1981: Public Service Award, Office of the President
1995: International Meteorological Organization Prize
1996: Presidential Citation Award by the then President Fidel V. Ramos
2007: Philippine Legion of Honor with the Rank of Grand Officer (Marangal na Pinuno) for his work in various international cooperations for tropical cyclone and earthquake disaster mitigation programs by President Gloria Arroyo

References

1929 births
2007 deaths
Filipino meteorologists
People from Cebu City
University of Texas at Austin alumni
University of the Philippines alumni